Gerdkooh ancient hills (Persian: تپه باستان گردکوه)  consists of three hills, the tallest of which is 26 m in height. Their history has been estimated to date back to the Iron Age. The hills are located in Qaem Shahr in Mazandaran Province. In exploring this area, a 4500-year-old grave has been found, as well as objects such as disposable tableware dishes related to the Parthian Empire and Sasanian Empire. There is evidence that the hills at the time of the Sasanian Empire and Muslim conquest of Persia were part of a  Castle.

See also 
Castles in Iran
Tepe Sialk

References

External links 
 video link
 Persian Wikipedia article

Archaeological sites in Iran
Geography of Mazandaran Province
Castles in Iran
Buildings and structures in Mazandaran Province
Tourist attractions in Mazandaran Province
National works of Iran